Leumann is an Italian surname. Notable people with the surname include:

 Carlos Alberto Leumann, an Argentine poet, teacher, and essayist
 Ernst Leumann, a Swiss jainologist
 Georg Leumann, a Swiss politician and President of the Swiss Council of States
 Katrin Leumann, a Swiss cross-country mountain biker.
 Manu Leumann, a Swiss Indo-Europeanist